Abdul Razak Salifu (born 1 October 1988) is a former Ghanaian professional football midfielder or striker.

Career 
Abdul began his career in Ghana by FC Maamobi, before moving to All Blacks. He later moved to AGF. He left AGF and moved on loan to Kolding FC. Abdul was handed a free transfer by AGF and a 1-year contract with Moldovan National Division side FC Zimbru Chişinău.

References

External links
AGF profile

1988 births
Living people
Ghanaian footballers
Aarhus Gymnastikforening players
All Blacks F.C. players
FC Zimbru Chișinău players
Association football forwards
Association football midfielders
Danish Superliga players
Moldovan Super Liga players
Ghanaian expatriate footballers
Expatriate men's footballers in Denmark
Expatriate footballers in Moldova